Manpal Singh is an Indian politician and a member of the Sixteenth Legislative Assembly of Uttar Pradesh in India. He represents the Kasganj constituency of Uttar Pradesh and is a member of the Samajwadi Party political party.

Early life and  education
Manpal Singh was born in Etah district. He attended the Dr. Bhimrao Ambedkar University and attained Bachelor of Laws degree.

Political career
Manpal Singh has been a MLA for six terms. He also became minister three times and represented the Kasganj constituency. He is a member of the Samajwadi Party political party.

Posts held

See also
 Kasganj (Assembly constituency)
 Sixteenth Legislative Assembly of Uttar Pradesh
 Uttar Pradesh Legislative Assembly

References 

Samajwadi Party politicians
Uttar Pradesh MLAs 1974–1977
Uttar Pradesh MLAs 1980–1985
Uttar Pradesh MLAs 1985–1989
Uttar Pradesh MLAs 2002–2007
Uttar Pradesh MLAs 2012–2017
People from Kasganj district
1938 births
Living people